Events in the year 1890 in music.

Specific locations
1890 in Norwegian music

Events 
January 15 – Pyotr Ilyich Tchaikovsky's The Sleeping Beauty (ballet) premieres at the Mariinsky Theatre in St. Petersburg.
 January–June period – George W. Johnson becomes the first African American to record phonograph cylinders, in New York.
June 21 – Richard Strauss conducts the premiere of his symphonic poem Death and Transfiguration at the Eisenach Festival.
September 3 – Carl Nielsen makes the first entry in his diary.
September 9 – Edward Elgar's concert overture Froissart is premiered at the Three Choirs Festival in Worcester.
December 6 – 7 – First full performance of Hector Berlioz's opera Les Troyens takes place at Karlsruhe, 21 years after the composer's death.
Charles-Marie Widor succeeds César Franck as organ professor at the Paris Conservatoire.
The New York Phonograph Company opens the first recording studio.

Published popular music 
 "The Commodore Song"
 "I was Dreaming" – August Juncker
 "Little Pig Went To Market" by J. Cheever Goodwin & Gustave Kerker
 "Maggie Murphy's Home" w. Edward Harrigan m. David Braham
 "Passing By" w. Robert Herrick m. Edward C. Purcell
 "Star of the East" w. George Cooper m. Amanda Kennedy
 "Throw Him Down McCloskey" w.m. John W. Kelly
 "You'll Miss Lots of Fun When You're Married" by John Philip Sousa & Edward M. Taber

Recorded popular music 
 "Anvil Chorus" – John York AtLee
 "Banjo Duet" – Bohee Minstrels
 "Down upon the Suwannee River" – Professor Baton's Brass and String Military Band
 "Everybody's Darling" – Duffy and Imgrund's Fifth Regiment Band
 "La Media Noche" – United States Marine Band
 "The Mocking Bird" – John York AtLee and Fred Gaisberg
 "Semper Fidelis" – United States Marine Band
 "The Song That Reached My Heart" – Duffy & Imgrund's Fifth Regiment Band
 "Third verse of Mary & John, The Lover's Quarrel" – Will White
 "The Thunderer" – United States Marine Band
 "The Washington Post" – United States Marine Band

Classical music 
Ferruccio Busoni – Violin Sonata No. 1, Opus 29
Ernest Chausson – Chansons de Shakespeare
Antonín Dvořák – 
Requiem
Symphony No. 8
Edward Elgar – Froissart
Alexander Glazunov – Symphony No. 3, Opus 33
Armas Järnefelt – Ouverture Lyrique
Carl Nielsen – String Quartet No. 2 in F minor
Hans Pfitzner – Sonata in F-sharp minor for cello and piano
Alexander Scriabin – Romance for Horn and Piano
Jean Sibelius – Piano Quintet in G minor
Johann Strauss II – Rathausball-Tänze
Sergei Taneyev – String Quartet No. 1 Opus 4
William Robert Knox – Gladys Gavotte

Opera 
 Cavalleria Rusticana by Pietro Mascagni
 Prince Igor begun by Alexander Borodin, completed by Alexander Glazunov and Nikolai Rimsky-Korsakov
 Queen of Spades by Pyotr Ilyich Tchaikovsky
Thorgrim by Frederic H. Cowen with libretto by Joseph Bennett

Musical theater 
 The Gondoliers     Broadway production
 Love And Law     Broadway production
 Robin Hood     Chicago production
 The Sentry     London production
 Reilly And The 400 Broadway production

Births 
February 25 – Myra Hess, pianist (d. 1965)
 February 27 – Freddie Keppard, jazz cornetist (d. 1933)
March 12 – Evert Taube, writer, artist, composer and singer (d. 1976)
March 17 – Harold Morris, pianist and composer (d. 1964)
 March 20
Beniamino Gigli, operatic tenor (d. 1957)
Lauritz Melchior, operatic tenor (d. 1973)
 March 28 – Paul Whiteman, bandleader (d. 1967)
 April 17 – Gussie Mueller, jazz clarinetist (d. 1965)
May 21 – Harry Tierney, songwriter, composer of "Irene" and "Rio Rita" (d. 1965)
 June 6 – Ted Lewis, bandleader (d. 1971)
 June 26 – Jeanne Eagels, Broadway star (d. 1929)
 July 18 – Victor Dolidze, Soviet-Georgian composer (d. 1933)
August 12 – Lillian Evanti, operatic soprano (d. 1967)
August 15 – Jacques Ibert, composer (d. 1962)
August 28 – Ivor Gurney, poet and composer (d. 1937)
September 9 – Francis Bousquet, French composer of classical music (d. 1942)
September 15 – Frank Martin, composer (d. 1974)
September 26 – Papanasam Sivan, Carnatic music composer (d. 1973)
October 1 – Stanley Holloway, English actor and singer (d. 1982)
October 8 – Samuel Hoffenstein, screenwriter and composer (d. 1947)
October 13 – Gösta Nystroem, composer (d. 1966)
October 20 – Jelly Roll Morton, American pianist, bandleader and composer (d. 1941)
November 10 – Mischa Bakaleinikoff, musical director (d. 1960)
December 8 – Bohuslav Martinů, classical composer (d. 1959)

Deaths 
January 8 – Giorgio Ronconi, operatic baritone (b. 1810)
January 17 – Salomon Sulzer, cantor and composer (b. 1804)
January 20 – Franz Lachner, conductor and composer (b. 1803)
February 14 – Wilhelm Fitzenhagen, cellist and music teacher (b. 1848)
March 13 – Henry Wylde, conductor, composer, music teacher and critic (b. 1822)
April 16 – John Barnett, composer and music writer (b. 1802)
May 6 – Hubert Léonard, violinist (b. 1819)
May 28 – Viktor Nessler, composer (b. 1841)
June 3 – Oskar Kolberg, folklorist and composer (b. 1814)
June 30 – Samuel Parkman Tuckerman, composer (b. 1819)
July 22 – Caterina Canzi, opera singer (b. 1805)
October 7 – John Hill Hewitt, songwriter (b. 1801)
October 17 – Prosper Sainton, violinist (b. 1813)
October 28 – Alexander John Ellis, music theorist (b. 1814)
November 8 – César Franck, composer (b. 1822)
December 21 – Niels Gade, composer (b. 1817)
date unknown – Ostap Veresai, minstrel and kobzar (b. 1803)

References

 
1890s in music
19th century in music
Music by year